Leo Rossi (15 July 1927 – 21 May 2011) was a Brazilian water polo player. He competed in the men's tournament at the 1952 Summer Olympics.

References

External links
 

1927 births
2011 deaths
Brazilian male water polo players
Olympic water polo players of Brazil
Water polo players at the 1952 Summer Olympics
Place of birth missing
Medalists at the 1951 Pan American Games
Pan American Games silver medalists for Brazil
Pan American Games medalists in water polo
Water polo players at the 1951 Pan American Games
20th-century Brazilian people